Nizampet is a satellite city of Hyderabad and a municipal corporation situated in Bachupally mandal, Medchal-Malkajgiri district of Telangana, India. It is administered as Nizampet Municipal Corporation.

Nizampet lies to the northwestern end of Hyderabad City. It is one of the fastest-growing suburbs around the IT corridor of Hyderabad, because of its affordability and relatively pollution-free environment and despite its water scarcity. In 2018, the government provided municipal water to the area which caused prices to rise.

This place is surrounded by several giant constructions including over 20,000 flats and few villas. There are many colonies in this place where houses and flats are built independently. Because of the silent and upcoming townships, Nizampet has become a popular place for living.

The proposed Outer Ring Road of Hyderabad will be near Nizampet village.

Commercial area
Nizampet is close to JNTU Metro rail, Kukatpally, Bachupally and Miyapur, which are hubs for all the shops and big commercial establishments with Metro rail connectivity. There are plenty of shops and supermarkets. The area is just a 2 km away from the shopping suburb of Nizampet Village

Nizampet Road has plenty of hospitals: SLG (Bachupally-Rajivgandhi Nagar), Sri Sri Holistic Hospitals, Metro Hospital, a multiple-specialty hospital is situated in the centre of the village and the major Apollo have started clinics in the road along. There are two Apollo  clinics in the Nizampet Road at 1 km, 3 km from the start, respectively. And Nest Children Hospital near Hanuman Temple.

Nizampet and Nizampet Village are considered to be a commercial hubs. There are many food and clothing shops near Hanuman Temple.

Problems
Nizampet and Nizampet Village has over 20,000 apartments. Most colonies face the problem of water scarcity and residents of these colonies usually complain of dried borewells and poor Municipal water supplies. There is no MLA or Government representative in this area to take care of illegal water connections/supplies as it is a huge profitable business for them. People living at Nizampet and Nizampet Village brought this problem to Govt authorities several times but no action has been taken so far.

The roads used to be pathetic some time ago, but thanks to the proactive lead taken by the local resident groups from Nizampet and Nizampet Village, no more struggles with bad roads but especially in the rainy season. People are unhappy with the roads due to Water clogging on the roads, there is no security on the roads if it is raining heavily.

Telangana Government is working on illegal constitutions made by builder, developers, leaders and local authorities. Now this concern has been with High Court, Govt. officials are awaiting for the High Court Orders to perform the action and streamline the Nizampet and Nizampet Village.

There are no water-harvesting pits at Nizampet and Nizampet Village.

Nizampet, Bachupally, Pragathinagar Municipal Corporation colonies
 Rajeev Gruha kalpha colony is the one of the biggest Colony in Nizampet Municipality with 3200 houses.

Brindhavan Estates, is one of the oldest duplex housing societies in Hyderabad, located on the way to Nizampet, approximately 0.5 km from the main Junction And Balaji Park Town Which is located near the Hanuman temple is a duplex community with more than fifty houses and four buildings.

There is also a colony called Jaya-bharath Nagar, which has a few houses and many apartments. It is located at the first right of entering the Nizampet road and is quiet. Esswar Villas has over 150 duplex villas in the village. Vertex Lake View Villas is a duplex-house gated community beside Esswar Villas.

Parvathi Villas is a duplex and triplex house gated community which is located at the heart of Nizampet. It has abundant water resources, including Godavari water.

Balaji Nagar is at Opp SBI Bank line and has nearly sixty large apartments. Every year colony people gather and conduct the Ganapathi Navarathulu and other celebrations.  

The Srinivasa Housing Society is the nearest colony to the Nizampet center, has a municipal water facility and a nearby park, and is opposite Hanuman Park.

Brindavan Colony, Narayana Reddy Huda Colony, Tirumala Nagar, Kolan Tulasi Reddy (KTR) Colony, Balaji Hills, Srinivasa Nagar Colony, and Prashanti Hills are fast-growing colonies of Nizampet, Quthbullapur Mandal, Medchal district. At present in KTR Colony there are about 60 apartments and some other apartments are under construction. Recently Sri Vinayaka Nagar colony is established on 6 February 2013.

Vazhraa Nirmaan's Pushpak is a premium two and three-bedroom luxury apartment complex in Madhura Nagar locality where many apartments are under construction.

A premium gated community of 399 flats is being constructed on Blooming Dale Road.

Transport
Nizampet is connected by the Telangana State Road Transport Corporation, which runs Bus 231M (which runs every hour like 3.15 PM, 4.15 PM) that connects to Secunderabad and some others to Hyderabad. 10N runs from Sec'bad station to Nizampet Village and Nizampet Junction to Bachupally. The 287N connects Koti and Nizampet. The closest two Hyderabad Multi-Modal Transport System stations are at the Hitech City Railway Station in Kukatpally Housing Board and the Hafeezpet Station. A proposed metro terminal and Intercity bus terminus at Bachupally are in proximity of Nizampet. The 195 route runs every 30 min from Bachupally-Waverock, Manikonda via Nizampet Village, JNTU, Hitech City, Infosys, wipro, DLF connects most of the IT corridor.

All roads are flooded in the rainy season.

Fitness

 Stark Fitness Studio In Pragathi Nagar
 Jaguar Gym (Pragathi Nagar)
 CrossXFit Box (Pragathi Nagar).

Education

Schools
The schools around Nizampet and Bachupally include:

 Lilliputs Pre School & Samskruti Vidyalaya
 Sanghamitra (Central Board of Secondary Education)
 Creek Planet School (Central Board of Secondary Education, Bachupally)
 ATRI Public School (Central Board of Secondary Education), Nizampet Road, Kukatpally, Hyderabad
 Kennedy High, the global school (Bachupally) (Central Board of Secondary Education)
 SR Digi school
 Little Flower Grammer high school, RGK, NIZAMPET.
 Vignan (Bachupally, Central Board of Secondary Education)
 Rajadhani Residential school (Nizampet) (Central Board of Secondary Education)
 Kidzee Pre school
 Crayons Creative School on Bloomingdale road.
 Ravindra Bharathi School (i-v: Central Board of Secondary Education, VI-X: State)
 Silver Oaks - The School of Hyderabad (Bachupally, Central Board of Secondary Education)
 Geetanjali Olympiad (Bachupally)
 Narayana E-Techno School

For 10+2 education institutes like Sri Chaitanya, Vignan, and NRI college are near Nizampet.

Higher Education
Nizampet is well surrounded by higher educational institutes. Some of the nearby higher educational institutes include:

Degree/PG colleges: Rishi UBR, MNR, Shantiniketan, Vignan (Bachupally)

Engineering colleges: BVRIT Hyderabad College of Engineering for Women, Gokaraju Rangaraju Institute of Engineering and Technology, VNR Vignana Jyothi Institute of Engineering and Technology,  Rishi MS Institute of Engineering and Technology for Women 

Pharmacy colleges: Gokaraju Rangaraju College of Pharmacy (Bachupally)

Management institutes: JNTUH, Rishi UBR.

Culture
Nizampet and Nizampet Road

 SreeBhu Sametha Sree Venkateshwara Swami Temple (Bhavya's Anandam Apt. Nizampet road)
Seven Hills Venkateswara Swami Temple and Vinayaka Temple
Anjaneya Swami temple (Brindavan Colony, Nizampet)

Nizampet Village
Sree Kanakadurga Ammavari Temple (back side of Abhayanjaneya Swami temple)
Ellamma Temple, on Blooming Dale Road
Abhayanjaneya Swami temple (Nizampet Village Bus Stop)
Hanuman Temple (Bandari Layout, Nizampet Village close to Gram Panchayat Office)
Srisitaramalayam over 500 years old (near Sriramula kunta and Nizampet lake- behind Nizampet Village Highschool)
Sri Mallikarjuna Temple (near Nizampet Village Water Tank)

See also
 Bachupally
 Miyapur
 Kukatpally

References

Villages in Ranga Reddy district
Neighbourhoods in Hyderabad, India